The One is a song by Danish singer Medina from her international debut studio album Welcome to Medina. It was released as the fifth single from the album on 15 August 2011. The song was written by Medina, Providers and Terri Bjerre and it was produced by Providers. "The One" peaked at number 64 in Germany.

Track listing
 Danish digital download
 "The One" – 3:58

Charts

Release history

References

External links
 

2011 singles
Dance-pop songs
Medina (singer) songs
Songs written by Rasmus Stabell
Songs written by Jeppe Federspiel
2010 songs
EMI Records singles
Songs written by Terri Bjerre
Songs written by Medina (singer)